The Upper Canada Repertory Company is a theatre company in Toronto, Ontario, Canada founded by Rochelle Douris in 2001. It offers a training program for young actors as well as professional stagings of classic and contemporary work.

Production history 
Her Infinite Variety, 2002 (Jane Mallet Theatre)
Simply Chekhov, 2003 (Jane Mallet Theatre)
Turks & Infidels, 2003 (Jane Mallet Theatre)
The Comedy Show, 2004 (Jane Mallet Theatre)
North Stars, 2005 (Equity Showcase Theatre)
Troilus and Cressida: Redux, 2006 (Berkeley Street Theatre)
Macbeth: Reloaded, 2007 (Berkeley Street Theatre)
A Midsummer Night's Dream, 2008 (Walmer Theatre)
A Streetcar Named Desire, 2008 (Walmer Theatre)
Romeo and Juliet, 2009 (The Theatre Centre)
A Midsummer Night's Dream, 2009 (Marsh Street Theatre)
A Streetcar Named Desire, 2009 (Marsh Street Theatre)
The Children's Hour, 2010 (The Theatre Centre)
Twelfth Night, 2010 (The Theatre Centre)
"Little Women", 2011 (George Ignatieff Theatre)
"The Outsiders", 2011 (George Ignatieff Theatre)
"The Lord of the Flies", 2012 (The Theatre Centre)
"The Great Gatsby", 2012 (The Theatre Centre)
"The Taming of the Shrew", 2013 (DanceMakers Theatre)
"Alice Unchained", 2014 (DanceMakers Theatre)

Summer Camps
Camps since 2011 have included a Shakespeare camp, a Musical Theatre ("Broadway") camp, and a one-week film acting intensive.

Junior Repertory Company
Members of the company participate in actor training at a high level reflecting professional-style training.

Membership is by audition and invitation only.

The program consists of twenty-six classes of training and rehearsal followed by a spring performance. Weekly five-hour class sessions teach acting, improvisation, theatre history, dance and singing, followed by rehearsal and performance of a play.

References

Theatre companies in Toronto